The Jonha Falls (also called Gautamdhara Falls) is a waterfall located in Ranchi district in the Indian state of Jharkhand.

Geography

Location
Jonha Falls is located at 

Note: The map alongside presents some of the notable locations in the district. All places marked in the map are linked in the larger full screen map.

The falls

Situated at an edge of the Ranchi plateau, the Jonha Falls is an example of a hanging valley falls. The Gunga River hangs over its master stream, Raru River and forms the falls.
One has to descend 722 steps to admire the surroundings.

The Jonha Falls is an example of a nick point caused by rejuvenation. Knick point, also called a nick point or simply nick, represents breaks in slopes in the longitudinal profile of a river caused by rejuvenation. The break in channel gradient allows water to fall vertically giving rise to a waterfall.

Culture
There is a tourist rest house which encloses a Buddhist shrine with a deity of Lord Gautama Buddha. A temple and an ashram dedicated to Buddha was built atop Gautam Pahar by the sons of Baldeo Das Birla. A fair is organized in Jonha every Tuesday and Saturday.

Transport
It is approachable by both road and train. Jonha Station is just 1.5 km from the fall.

See also
List of waterfalls in India
List of waterfalls in India by height

References

Waterfalls of Jharkhand
Ranchi